The 2017 European Athletics U23 Championships were the 11th edition of the biennial athletics competition between European athletes under the age of twenty-three. It was held in Bydgoszcz, Poland from 13 to 16 July. This was the second time that the competition was hosted by Bydgoszcz after the 2003 edition.

Medal summary

Men

Track

* Medalists who participated in heats only.

Field

Combined

Women

Track

Field

Combined

Medal table

Participation

 (1)
 (1)
 (15)
 (2)
 (28)
 (17)
 (3)
 (7)
 (19)
 (7)
 (29)
 (13)
 (13)
 (41)
 (58)
 (2)
 (72)
 (2)
 (45)
 (15)
 (32)
 Independent Athletes (2)
 (9)
 (18)
 (8)
 (81)
 (1)
 (10)
 (22)
 (3)
 (2)
 (2)
 (5)
 (19)
 (27)
 (58)
 (28)
 (25)
 (2)
 (10)
 (15)
 (12)
 (64)
 (43)
 (32)
 (44)
 (49)

Records 
  Konrad Bukowiecki 21.26 CR -Shot Put Men- Qlf
  Konrad Bukowiecki 21.44 CR -Shot Put Men- Final
  Konrad Bukowiecki 21.59 CR -Shot Put Men- Final
  Yasemin Can 31:39.80 CR -10,000 metres- Final
  Anita Horvat 51.94 NR -400 metres- Heats
  Caroline Agnou 6330 NR -Heptathlon-
  Norbert Rivasz-Tóth 83.08 NR -Javelin throw- Final
  Ján Volko 20.33 CR, NR -200 metres- Final
  Simo Lipsanen 17.14 NR -Triple jump- Final
  Karsten Warholm 48.37 CR -400 metres hurdles- Final

References

External links

Official results
Results book

 
European Athletics U23 Championships
International athletics competitions hosted by Poland
Sport in Bydgoszcz
European Athletics U23 Championships
European Athletics U23 Championships
European Athletics U23 Championships
History of Bydgoszcz